Euabalong is a town in western New South Wales, Australia. At the 2016 census, Euabalong had a population of 188.

The town is served by a railway station on the Broken Hill railway line at nearby Euabalong West.

History
The town was surveyed by 1873 and town lots were sold in October that year. A visitor to Euabalong in 1877 described it as "a most forsaken and deserted looking hole" but did note that "business is said to be pretty brisk there" and that the drinkers were "more refined" than those at Condobolin upstream. At that time, the primary buildings in the town were "two public houses, a blacksmith's establishment, a newly-built edifice intended for a public house, and a rather expensively-constructed store". The Lachlan River at Euabalong has also been known to flood or flow very high over the years when the river has flooded in other areas like Forbes and Condobolin.

References

External links

Towns in New South Wales
Cobar Shire